André Heller (born 17 December 1975 in Novo Hamburgo) is a former volleyball player from Brazil. A three-time Olympian (2000, 2004 and 2008), he played as a middle-blocker. He won the gold medal with the men's national team at the 2003 FIVB Men's World Cup in Japan and at the 2004 Summer Olympics in Athens, Greece.

After the 2013–2014 season, he retired from professional volleyball at the age of 38.

Honours
 1998 FIVB World League — 5th place
 1998 World Championship — 4th place
 1999 FIVB World League — 3rd place
 2000 FIVB World League — 3rd place
 2000 Olympic Games — 6th place
 2001 FIVB World League — 1st place
 2001 World Grand Champions Cup — 2nd place
 2002 FIVB World League — 2nd place
 2003 FIVB World League — 1st place
 2003 FIVB World Cup — 1st place
 2003 Pan American Games — 3rd place
 2005 FIVB World League — 1st place
 2005 America's Cup — 2nd place
 2006 FIVB World League — 1st place
 2006 World Championship — 1st place
 2007 FIVB World League — 1st place

References

External links
 FIVB Profile
 

1975 births
Living people
Brazilian men's volleyball players
Volleyball players at the 2003 Pan American Games
Volleyball players at the 2007 Pan American Games
Volleyball players at the 2000 Summer Olympics
Volleyball players at the 2004 Summer Olympics
Volleyball players at the 2008 Summer Olympics
Olympic volleyball players of Brazil
Olympic gold medalists for Brazil
Olympic silver medalists for Brazil
Brazilian people of German descent
Sportspeople from Rio Grande do Sul
Olympic medalists in volleyball
Medalists at the 2008 Summer Olympics
Medalists at the 2004 Summer Olympics
Pan American Games bronze medalists for Brazil
Pan American Games gold medalists for Brazil
Pan American Games medalists in volleyball
Medalists at the 2003 Pan American Games
Medalists at the 2007 Pan American Games